Pleasant Hill/Contra Costa Centre station is a Bay Area Rapid Transit (BART) station serving the Contra Costa Centre Transit Village in Contra Costa Centre, California, just north of Walnut Creek and just east of Pleasant Hill.

History 

Service at Pleasant Hill station began on May 21, 1973.

A second parking garage opened at the station on June 30, 2008. The former surface parking lot was converted into the Contra Costa Centre transit village. On September 23, 2010, the BART Board voted to change the station name to Pleasant Hill/Contra Costa Centre. The name change was supported by the transit village developer and the Contra Costa County Redevelopment Agency, but opposed by the city of Pleasant Hill. The Contra Costa County Redevelopment Agency and the developer paid the $413,800 cost of changing station signage and system maps.

An improved access path to the station better connecting it with the Iron Horse Regional Trail was proposed before the Walnut Creek city council on July 15, 2008. The proposal gained support from BART and the local cycling organization. A bridge over Treat Boulevard carrying the Iron Horse Regional Trail was completed on October 2, 2010. The bridge cost $12 million.

Bus connections 

Pleasant Hill/Contra Costa Centre is a transfer point for a number of County Connection local routes:
Weekday: 7, 9, 11, 14, 15, 18
Weekend: 311, 316

The station is also served by several longer-distance routes: FAST Solano Express Blue Line and AC Transit Early Bird Express route 702.

All buses stop on a two-way busway on the southwest side of the station.

References

External links 

BART – Pleasant Hill/Contra Costa Centre

Bay Area Rapid Transit stations in Contra Costa County, California
Railway stations in the United States opened in 1973
Stations on the Yellow Line (BART)